"Chuck Versus Operation Awesome" is the fourth episode of the third season of Chuck, originally airing January 18, 2010. When Devon becomes an unwilling agent of the Ring, Chuck must take on the role of his handler and help him survive the Ring's dangerous test. Meanwhile, at the Buy More, Morgan gets promoted, and must take on the antics of Jeff and Lester.

Plot summary

Main plot
The episode begins immediately where "Chuck Versus the Angel de la Muerte" left off. An agent of the Ring named Sydney holds Devon prisoner on the roof of a skyscraper, having mistaken him for the spy responsible for Chuck's previous mission to protect Alejandro Goya. She doesn't believe his claim that he is just a doctor, and coerces him into working for her. Back at Castle, Chuck is beginning to panic as the team tries to locate Devon. Sarah and Casey finally convince him to go to work, but in his distracted state Chuck loses control of The Intersect and threatens a Thai customer in her native tongue, and kicks Lester in the face before Sarah arrives with news about Devon. Chuck begins to panic, but Devon enters the store alive. He is debriefed by Beckman and the team - Devon is to contact Sydney that night. Beckman wishes to use Devon to flush out Sydney and hack The Ring's communications network, to which Chuck objects and is overruled.

That night Devon is given a communicator and earpiece by the Ring. Under the team's supervision, Devon contacts Sydney for his orders - he is to infiltrate a downtown office building and await further instructions. The earpiece has an explosive that will be triggered if he tries to remove it or if he disobeys. While Chuck, Sarah and Casey wait in the van, Devon enters the building and is stopped by security. Chuck takes it on himself to go in and help guide Devon through the building, using the Intersect to help disable the building's security guards. They arrive at their destination on the 12th floor, where Sydney orders Devon to kill a man in an office. Reaching their target, the two realize that it's actually a CIA installation. He warns Sarah and Casey, who have also spotted Sydney, but are locked in the van by Beckman, who reveals that the operation is a setup. Chuck has Devon take cover and confronts the occupant. Chuck begins to explain, but the man is already aware of why he is there and tells him to kill him as he was instructed after giving him a folded up note to open after Sydney is finished. Chuck hesitates, and the agent takes the gun and shoots himself after swallowing a capsule of amiodarone. Devon is stunned, thinking Chuck killed him, but there's no time to explain before Sydney arrives. Chuck takes cover, making it look like Devon killed the agent. Sydney is pleased, takes off Devon's explosive earpiece while giving him a Ring communications device, and leaves.  Chuck opens the note given to him by the agent, which has instructions on how to revive him from the effects of the drug. As Devon injects adrenalin into his heart according to the instructions, the man awakens and introduces himself as Daniel Shaw.

Back at Castle, Beckman turns over command of the team to Shaw who wishes to continue to use Devon as a mole against Sydney's Ring cell, but Chuck once again objects to using his brother-in-law. Instead, he takes it upon himself to hack into Sydney's communications and reveal himself as the spy she really wants, luring her to the Buy More. However, when he tells Casey and Sarah, Shaw forces them to stand down at gunpoint and tells Chuck that he got himself into the situation and must get himself out. He also expresses an interest in seeing what Chuck had planned. Sydney arrives at the store and Chuck begins to panic (his plan was to use himself as bait and for Casey and Sarah to take care of the Ring agents). The Intersect fails to work, but he manages to escape into the storage cage. Sarah and Casey get the drop on Shaw and escape Castle to go after Chuck, disabling several of Sydney's goons. Chuck deals with the other two by electrocuting one on the storage cage, (see below) who accidentally shoots the other as he convulses. Sarah attacks Sydney but is disabled after a short fight, but Sydney herself is forced to flee when Chuck recovers a gun from one of her men.

Outside at the loading dock, Chuck holds Sydney at gunpoint and asks her to surrender. Sydney is unimpressed and threatens to call her superiors to force Chuck to shoot. She pulls a hidden knife as Sarah arrives, and when Chuck hesitates, a shot rings out. Sydney collapses as Shaw steps out from behind one of the Herders, having fatally shot her. At Castle, Shaw chides Chuck for letting his feelings for his family and friends prevent him from taking the shot, but Sarah comes to his defense and tells Shaw sometimes it helps to have something to lose. Chuck later returns home to dinner with Morgan, Ellie and Devon to let Devon know Sydney has been taken care of and he's now safe. As Sarah and Casey join them, Shaw watches on Castle's monitor and pulls a ring from his pocket and after gazing at it for a moment, slips it on his finger.

Buy More
At the Buy More, Big Mike calls Morgan into his office. Because of the respect his coworkers have begun showing him, Big Mike offers Morgan the assistant manager's position, and Morgan accepts. His first challenge comes in the form of Jeff and Lester's antics. After being kicked by Chuck, Lester begins to hold stage fights in the Buy More storage cage for the same adrenaline rush. All the Buy More staff is soon involved in fights during store hours, including hooking a car battery up to the cage to prevent unwilling participants from escaping the cage (see above). Morgan shuts down the fights, but gains the resentment of his coworkers. When Jeff and Lester begin giving him trouble later, on Big Mike's advice, he singles out Lester and fires him in front of the other employees for his behavior. Lester begs him to reconsider, and with his authority now firmly established, relents and places him on "double-secret" probation.

Production
Casting for "Chuck Versus Operation Awesome" began on August 27, 2009. Actor Brandon Routh's casting as Daniel Shaw was announced on the same day, and actress Angie Harmon was announced for the role of Sydney on September 4.

Production details
 Despite starting immediately after the end of "Chuck Versus the Angel de la Muerte", Casey shows no effects of his gunshot wound in the previous episode.
 Brandon Routh's first appearance as Daniel Shaw made him the most recent actor (until the appearance of Kristin Kreuk in the next episode) connected to the Superman television and movie franchise, including Tony Todd (season one of Smallville), Ryan McPartlin and Matthew Bomer (both auditioned for the role of Superman in Superman Returns but were beaten out by Routh), and Adam Baldwin (voiced Superman in the animated movie Superman: Doomsday). Bomer would later voice Superman in the animated movie Superman: Unbound.
The Wilhelm scream can be heard when Lester electrocutes the fight cage.

Flashes
 While in the Buy More, Chuck flashes first on how to speak Thai when an angry customer begins to berate him in that language, and on martial arts when Lester begins pestering him on the fighting styles of Jean-Claude Van Damme and Steven Seagal.
 When encountering several security guards in the office building, Chuck flashes on advanced sharpshooting techniques to take them out with a tranquilizer gun.

References to popular culture
 When Big Mike asks whether Morgan is reading to "run with the big dogs", the echoing music which is heard references Jerry Goldsmith's similar theme from the film Patton where it is heard when Gen. Patton considers his destiny.
 Lester paraphrases Seagal's role in the film Under Siege ("I'm a lowly cook") when asking Chuck whether Seagal or Van Damme would win in a fight.
 Much of the Buy More plot makes reference to the film Fight Club, with Lester even wearing the same style of sunglasses as Tyler Durden in the film.
 Lester references the film The Warriors, by mimicking the famous scene of Luther clinking bottles together chanting "Warriors, come out and play-yay," instead calling for Morgan.
 When Chuck quickly tranquilizes all the guards confronting him and Devon in the office building, he chalks his firearms skills up to his experience playing Duck Hunt on the NES.
 Devon stabbing Shaw in the heart with adrenalin to revive him is an homage to a scene in Pulp Fiction in which adrenalin is used to revive Uma Thurman's character.
 Lester's line "I got nowhere else to go. I got nowhere else to go" is a reference to the film An Officer and a Gentleman, where it is said by Richard Gere's character.
 Morgan putting Lester on "double secret probation" is a reference to the film National Lampoon's Animal House.
 When Chuck unwittingly kicks Lester, Jeff exclaims "Boom Boom Pow!" which is a reference to the popular The Black Eyed Peas single.
 Chuck greets Ellie and Devon with a Ned Flandersesque "Hi-dilly-ho, neighbours!" when welcoming them for dinner.

References

External links 
 

Operation Awesome
2010 American television episodes